Liyanage may refer to:

A. S. P. Liyanage, Sri Lankan businessman, television and film producer, and diplomat
Athma Liyanage, Sri Lankan singer and songwriter
Dayantha Liyanage, MBE, FMS, MCMI, Sri Lankan born British politician and management consultant
Douglas Liyanage, CCS, former Sri Lankan civil servant
Dulip Liyanage (born 1972), former Sri Lankan cricketer
E. P. B. Liyanage, CEng, psc, MRAeS, FIE(SL), retired officer of the Sri Lanka Air Force
Grashan Liyanage (born 1963), Sri Lankan former first-class cricketer
Hemasiri Liyanage, Sri Lankan television, cinema and theatre actor
Himasha Liyanage (born 1996), Sri Lankan cricketer
Imal Liyanage (born 1977), Sri Lankan cricketer
Imal Liyanage (born 1994), Sri Lankan-born cricketer for Qatar
Indrachapa Liyanage (born 1982), Sri Lankan singer
Janith Liyanage (born 1995), Sri Lankan cricketer
Nadeeka Lakmali Babaranda Liyanage (born 1981), Sri Lankan javelin thrower
Parry Liyanage, Sri Lankan military officer, athlete and coach
Srimath Indrajith Liyanage, television, music and literary personality in Sri Lanka
Sumith Liyanage (born 1936), Ceylonese sportsman
Upul Liyanage, one of the veteran media officials in Sri Lanka

See also
Liana
Lyana
Lynge (disambiguation)

Surnames of Sri Lankan origin
Sinhalese surnames